Achalpuram Shivalokathyagar Temple (ஆச்சாள்புரம் சிவலோகத்தியாகர் கோயில்) is a Hindu temple located at Achalpuram in Mayiladuthurai district of Tamil Nadu, India.  The presiding deity is Shiva. He is called as Shivalokathyagar. His consort is known as Tiruvennetru Umaiammai.

Significance 
It is one of the shrines of the 275 Paadal Petra Sthalams - Shiva Sthalams glorified in the early medieval Tevaram poems by Tamil Saivite Nayanar Tirugnanasambandar. The temple is believed to have been the place where saint Sambanthar's spirit merged with the deity. It is believed that Sambandar attained Mukti (salvation) at this place. Many other saints like Thiruneelakanta Yazhpanar, Madhanga Soodamani, Tiruneelanakka Nayanar and Muruga Nayanar also attained salvation here. The temple is counted as one of the temples built on the banks of River Kaveri.

Literary Mention 
Tirugnanasambandar describes the feature of the deity as:

References

External links 
 
 

Shiva temples in Mayiladuthurai district
Padal Petra Stalam